Journey to the West: The Demons Strike Back is a 2017 Chinese fantasy adventure comedy film directed by Tsui Hark. A sequel to Stephen Chow's 2013 film Journey to the West: Conquering the Demons, it was produced and co-written by both Tsui and Chow.

The film follows the adventures of Tang Sanzang and his disciples Sun Wukong, Zhu Bajie, and Sha Wujing after the events of the first film; all four roles have been recast. The film was released in China by Lianrui Pictures on 28 January 2017 in MX4D, 4DX, IMAX 3D and 3D.

Plot
The monk Tang Sanzang (Kris Wu) finds himself as a giant in a city in India. His master congratulates him on reaching India and retrieving the Sutras, and gives him a halo as a reward. The halo, however, malfunctions and Tang awakes from his dream to find himself in an alley in a village of circus performers with his three disciples: Sun Wukong (Lin Gengxin); Zhu Bajie (Yang Yiwei); and Sha Wujing (Mengke Bateer). Tang encourages Sun Wukong to perform for the villagers, but the disciple refuses. Angered by this stubbornness, Tang provokes Sun Wukong by calling him a "bad monkey", which causes Sun Wukong to smash the village and damage the villagers' homes in his temper. The terrified villagers present the group with money and food for their travels, but Sun Wukong continues wreaking havoc, sending Zhu Bajie and Tang flying through the air. That night, Tang whips Sun Wukong for his disobedience.

The next morning, Tang goes to find water for their breakfast congee and comes across a house. Its host, a beautiful woman in a splendid outfit (Wang Likun), welcomes them all in for breakfast with her companions. Sun Wukong, however, sees through their disguises as spider demons; he purposely provokes them until she and the others show their true form. During the subsequent battle, the demons come together to form one huge spider. After being poisoned by the spider, Sha Wujing falls ill and slowly bloats into a fish-like creature. Sun Wukong defeats the spider and Tang attempts to exorcise her, but Sun Wukong smashes in the demon's head with one blow. Once more, Tang is annoyed at Sun Wukong's disobedience and whips him again that evening. Later that night, the enraged Sun Wukong discusses with the other disciples his plans to kill Tang, but the others fear Tang's mighty Buddha Palm powers. Tang overhears this conversation and prays to Buddha to help him and also confesses that he actually does not know, or have, Buddha Palm powers. Zhu Bajie overhears this admission and tells Sun Wukong, who challenges Tang to a fight. Just as Sun Wukong is about to strike, a blinding ray of light shines from the heavens and he retreats.

The next day, the group pass into the capital city of the Biqiu Kingdom and a minister (Yao Chen) comes out to greet them and bring them to see the king: an immature and childlike man who likes to play games. The king orders Tang to perform for him but the monk does not have anything to showcase. Sun Wukong therefore pastes an "obedience sticker" on Tang allowing Tang to copy his actions and perform stunts for the king. Sun Wukong, however, goes too far and makes Tang slap the king continuously, who throws them all out. Tang orders Sun Wukong to return and apologize, but it is revealed that Sun Wukong purposely provoked the king to make him reveal his form as the demon Red Boy. They fight and Sun Wukong defeats Red Boy, also freeing the true king of Biqiu (Bao Bei'er) from his cage under the throne. As a reward for helping him, the king presents them with a beautiful girl, Felicity (Lin Yun), to accompany them on their travels. As Felicity dances for them, Tang is reminded of his deceased lover, Duan (Shu Qi).

The group set off and on the way, Sun Wukong realizes that Felicity is actually a demon. In the meantime, Felicity takes out the nose plugs on Sha Wujing, allowing him to sneeze out the poison and turn him back into his human form. Tang, however, does not believe him, so they set off to visit Felicity's home village. Sun Wukong becomes enraged with Tang's lack of trust in him and that night he destroys the whole village, killing everyone. Tang stops him from killing Felicity, further angering Sun Wukong, who attacks Tang, but Felicity finally confesses that she is actually the demon White Bone Spirit and that the whole village was an illusion conjured by her. Sun Wukong flares up and turns into a giant Monkey King demon and swallows Tang. At that moment, the minister and Red Boy arrive and see Sun Wukong has fallen for their trick.

They had deliberately sent Felicity with the group to cause strife between Tang and Sun Wukong, so Sun Wukong would kill his master. Sun Wukong spits Tang out, however, as they had known this all along, but played along with story so that the minister would reveal her true form. They battle and the minister creates an illusion of Buddhas surrounding Sun Wukong, using them to fight him. The real Buddha, however, uses his giant palm to destroy the false Buddhas and reveals the minister's real identity as the Immortal Golden Vulture.

After the battle, Tang heads back to find a dying Felicity. He has no choice but to free her soul as there is too much demon in her. Before she dies, Felicity asks Tang if he loves her, Tang replies that he has only one person in his heart. The animosity between Tang and Sun Wukong has finally dissolved; together with Sha Wujing and Zhu Bajie, they continue their journey to the West through a desert.

In a post-credits scene, breaking of the fourth wall was invoked with the appearance of a modern movie theater, where theater employees telling both the viewer and the in-story audience that its time to leave and there is no post-credits scene.

Cast
Kris Wu as Tang Sanzang.
Lin Gengxin as Sun Wukong.
Yang Yiwei as Zhu Bajie.
Mengke Bateer as Sha Wujing.
Yao Chen as Jiu Gong/Immortal Golden Vulture.
Lin Yun as Felicity/White Bone Spirit.
Wang Likun as the spider demon.
Bao Bei'er as the king.
Wang Duo as the handsome Zhu Bajie. 
Da Peng as a Taoist priest.
Cheng Sihan as Tang Sanzang's teacher, in Tang Sanzang's dream.
Shu Qi as Duan, a cameo appearance in flashback scenes and in Tang Sanzang's imagination.
Tsui Hark and Stephen Chow as theater employees; a cameo appearance, post-credit scene.

Production
Principal photography began in October 2015. This was the first major collaboration between Chow and Tsui. Previously, during Spring Festival 2016, Tsui Hark had only a cameo role in Chow's The Mermaid. Here, however, Tsui directed the film, which was written by Chow, who was also the executive producer. The film was shot in 3D. The companies that produced and/or invested in the film are: China Film Group Corporation, Star Overseas, Hehe (Shanghai) Pictures, Xiangshan Zeyue Media, Shanghai Tao Piao Piao Entertainment, Wanda Media, Dadi Century Films (Beijing), Guangzhou JinYi Media Corporation, Zhejiang HengDian Entertainment, Tianjin Maoyan Media, Maxtimes Culture (Tianjin) Films, Lianrui (Shanghai) Pictures, Huayi Brothers Media Group, Shanghai New Culture Media Group, Dongshen (Shanghai) Pictures, Black Ant Shanghai Entertainment, Horgos Hehe Pictures, Horgos Lianrui Pictures, Wuxi Huichi Entertainment and Shanghai Mengchacha Entertainment Investment.

Release
The film was released in China on 28 January 2017, the start of the Chinese New Year holiday. In December 2016, Sony Pictures acquired the North American and multi-territory distribution rights to the film for the U.S., Canada, the U.K., Australia, New Zealand and much of Asia outside the Mainland China (including Taiwan, Singapore, Malaysia, Brunei, Thailand, the Philippines, Vietnam, Laos and Cambodia). The film opened simultaneously with its Chinese release (28 January) in Malaysia, Vietnam, Singapore, Cambodia, Australia and New Zealand. The UK and U.S. release followed on 3 February 2017, with that in Indonesia, the Philippines and Thailand taking place later in the month.

Promotion
Journey to the West: Demon Chapter had its first teaser released in China on 8 November 2016.

Box office

Pre-release
The Demons Strike Back was made on a production budget of 440 million yuan ($63.9 million) with an additional 140 million yuan ($20 million) spent on marketing (promotion and advertising) materials. The film was highly anticipated in China by both industry insiders and ordinary moviegoers and was projected to emerge very successful at the box office, partly due to the robust demand and success of the first film. Moreover, in its domestic market, the film was released during the Chinese New Year period, the most lucrative time of the year for local films. The holiday, which is also known as Spring Festival, is a coveted release period in the country in which millions of Chinese moviegoers – both casual and hardcore fans – flock to theaters in what is regarded as the busiest moviegoing period on the planet. Since the period is a strategic time to release films with blockbuster potential, The Demons Strike Back faced competition. Nine other Chinese-made films opened on the same day and films such as Kung Fu Yoga, Buddies in India, Duckweed, The Village of No Return and Boonie Bears: Entangled World posed a box office challenge for the film. The film pre-sold more than 100 million yuan ($14.54 million) worth of tickets, according to the film distributors and promoters, breaking the previous record held by Chow's The Mermaid.

The main draw of the film has been credited to Tsui Hark who has directed some of the highest-grossing films in China, including the recent The Taking of Tiger Mountain and Young Detective Dee: Rise of the Sea Dragon. Chow's involvement in the project is also considered a factor in the early momentum for the film, but the impact of the cast is seen as mixed.

Theatrical run
The film opened 28 January 2017 and grossed over 345–360 million yuan ($50–52 million) on its opening day. Data from research group Entgroup showed that the movie had 103,065 screenings and registered 8.7 million admissions on Saturday, the busiest day ever at the Chinese box office. This broke the record for the biggest single/opening day for a local film in China, dethroning The Mermaids former record of 270 million yuan in 2016. The record for all films is that of Furious 7s 391 million yuan opening day sales. Before this, the film made an estimated 10.45 million yuan ($1.5 million) from midnight previews on Friday night. It earned 209 million yuan ($30.4 million) on its second day, Sunday, bringing its two-day cumulative total to 553 million yuan ($80.3 million), with some figures going as high as $83 million. This broke the record for the biggest Saturday-Sunday opening in China, created a year earlier by the Hollywood film Star Wars: The Force Awakens. In IMAX the film broke the record for the biggest single/opening day with $4.2 million from 390 screens and the best Chinese New Year opening day for IMAX. It came in third for all titles, behind Warcraft and Furious 7. In two days, the gross was worth $7.4 million, the second best, behind The Force Awakens.

After its record-breaking openings, The Demons Strikes Back began to witness significant falls in accruing revenues from its third day onwards. In three days, the film made a combined 728 million yuan ($105.9 million) compared to The Mermaids 770 million yuan ($117.4 million) and the discrepancy widened in the following days. One major reason for the film's fall in demand was the negative reception and bad word-of-mouth from critics and audiences that took a mounting toll on the film's box office performance. Its average user ratings from China's major online film portals such as Douban, Maoyan, Gewara, and Mtime were among the lowest for such a wide release. By comparison, in Douban, The Demons Strike Back scored just 6.9/10 compared to The Mermaids 8.0/10.

Outside the Middle Kingdom, Sony Pictures acquired the rights to distribute the film in many territories. The studio released the film simultaneously across six markets with the Chinese premiere, realising a two-day weekend haul of $2.2 million from 362 screens.

Its worldwide box office total now (as of 16 February 2017) stands at $239.5 million, with $232 million from China's market. It also has become the highest-grossing film in Tsui Hark's career and the highest-grossing film among the Journey to the West novel adaptations.

Critical reception
Rotten Tomatoes reported that 58% of critics have given the film a positive review based on 12 reviews, with an average rating of 5.76/10. On Metacritic, the film has a weighted average score of 59 out of 100 based on 4 critic reviews, indicating "mixed or average reviews".

RogerEbert.com gave the movie a glowing review and a 3/4 rating. They called the collaboration between Stephen Chow and Tsui Hark a "worthy fusion of two of the film world's most brilliant stars" and praised the film saying, "it's got more imagination in one nimble limb than a Fast & Furious sequel or a Star Wars prequel can lay claim to in their whole battered chassis." The Hollywood Reporter gave a mixed review, praising the film for its action sequences and special effects, but criticizing its screenplay, narration and weak character development. South China Morning Post also criticized the performance of its leads.

Awards and nominations

References

External links

2010s adventure comedy films
2017 films
Chinese fantasy comedy films
Chinese sequel films
Films directed by Tsui Hark
Films based on Journey to the West
Alibaba Pictures films
Demons in film
2017 3D films
Chinese 3D films
4DX films
China Film Group Corporation films
Wanda Pictures films
Huayi Brothers films
IMAX films
2010s fantasy comedy films
2017 comedy films
Films set in ancient India
2010s Mandarin-language films